Indre Sogn Sparebank is a Norwegian savings bank, headquartered in Årdalstangen, Norway. The bank's main market is the area surrounding Sognefjorden.

The bank was established in 1971 with the merger of Årdal Sparebank, Lærdal Sparebank and Borgund Sparebank.  The bank is a member of Eika Gruppen.

References

Banks of Norway
Companies based in Sogn og Fjordane
Banks established in 1971
Companies listed on the Oslo Stock Exchange
Norwegian companies established in 1971